Racing Glaciers are an English rock band which formed in the summer of 2012. The band members include Tim Monaghan, Danny Thorpe, Matt Scheepers, Simon John, and Matt Welch.

Discography
Albums
 Caught in the Strange (2016)
EPs
 Racing Glaciers (2012)
 Ahead Of You Forever (2014)
 Don't Wait For Me (2014)

Singles
 Moths (2014)
 First Light (2014)
 V H S (2014)
 What I Saw (2015)
 Seems Like a Good Time (2015)

References

English alternative rock groups
English pop rock music groups
Musical groups established in 2012
2012 establishments in England